Jeff Lebby (born January 5, 1984) is an American football coach and former player who is currently the offensive coordinator and quarterbacks coach at the University of Oklahoma. He has previously served as an assistant coach at the University of Mississippi (Ole Miss), Baylor University and University of Central Florida (UCF).

Playing career
Lebby played high school football at Andrews High School. He earned All-State honors his senior year and signed with Oklahoma to play football. An injury ended his playing career in college.

Coaching career

Early career
After the injury ended his playing career, he switched to coaching and stayed at Oklahoma as a student assistant. At Oklahoma, he would meet then-Oklahoma quarterback and future boss Josh Heupel. He left Oklahoma to coach the offensive line and tight ends at Victoria High School (Texas).

Baylor
Lebby came back to the collegiate ranks in 2008, and served various roles for Baylor across nine seasons which included passing game coordinator for two seasons. From 2008 to 2011, he was the assistant director of football operations. He also served five seasons as a running backs coach.

Role during 2015 Baylor football scandal

While coaching at Baylor University, Lebby was named by Baylor student Dolores Lozano as one of the coaches that took no action against running back Devin Chafin after she reported being physically assaulted three times by him. After Art Briles was terminated by Baylor, Lebby defended Briles, who is also Lebby's father-in-law, and sold shirts with #CAB (Coach Art Briles) in a show of continued support.

Southeastern
He got his first full time offensive coordinator opportunity at Southeastern, an NAIA school in Florida. He helped lead Southeastern to the Mid-South Conference Sun Division title and a playoff berth. Southeastern would finish with the No. 1 scoring offense and the No. 3 total offense in the NAIA that year.

UCF
On December 24, 2017, UCF announced the hire of Lebby as their quarterback coach and passing game coordinator, reuniting with Josh Heupel. Under his guidance, quarterback McKenzie Milton was 7th in yards per attempt and 9th in passing efficiency rating. Milton would finish 6th in Heisman Trophy voting that year. He was promoted to offensive coordinator the following year in 2019. His offense ranked 5th in total offense and true freshman quarterback Dillon Gabriel threw for 3,653 yards and 29 touchdowns.

Ole Miss
On December 11, 2019, Lebby was hired by Lane Kiffin at Ole Miss to serve in the same role as he did at UCF. In his first season with the Rebels, Lebby's offense ranked eighth in total offense.

On January 6, 2021, Lebby signed a two-year extension with Ole Miss.

Oklahoma
On December 8, 2021, Oklahoma football finalized a deal for Lebby to be the Sooners' new offensive coordinator under newly hired head coach Brent Venables. Lebby’s contract with Oklahoma is for three years and $5.7 million dollars.

References

External links
 
 Ole Miss Rebels profile

1984 births
Living people
People from McGregor, Texas
Coaches of American football from Texas
Oklahoma Sooners football coaches
University of Oklahoma alumni
High school football coaches in Texas
Baylor Bears football coaches
Southeastern Fire football coaches
UCF Knights football coaches
Ole Miss Rebels football coaches